Lieutenant Colonel Sylvain Ndoutingai (born 24 May 1971) is a military officer and politician in the Central African Republic. He is the nephew of former president François Bozizé. He was born in Bossangoa. 

Ndoutingai was Minister of State of Mines, Energy, and Water Resources from 2008 to April 2011. He was Minister of Finance and Budget from 2006 to 2008 and from 2011 to 2012. He was dismissed by Bozizé in June 2012.

References

Living people
Finance ministers of the Central African Republic
Government ministers of the Central African Republic
Central African Republic military personnel
1971 births